Cinder Cone is a cinder cone with a small crater on the west side of the Helm Glacier in Garibaldi Provincial Park in British Columbia, Canada. Cinder Cone is surrounded by cinder flats and its crater is filled with meltwater during the summer. Cinder Cone is eroded easily by meltwater during the spring, washing the pyroclastics into the Valley of Desolation.

See also
 List of Cascade volcanoes
 List of volcanoes of Canada
 Volcanism of Western Canada

References
 
 

Cinder cones of British Columbia
Subduction volcanoes
Volcanic crater lakes
Holocene volcanoes
Inactive volcanoes
Polygenetic volcanoes
Garibaldi Lake volcanic field
One-thousanders of British Columbia